{{DISPLAYTITLE:C5H4O}}
The molecular formula C5H4O (molar mass: 80.08 g/mol, exact mass: 80.0262 u) may refer to:

 Cyclopentadienone
 
 

Molecular formulas